The 1958 Preakness Stakes was the 83rd running of the $150,000 Preakness Stakes thoroughbred horse race. The race took place on May 17, 1958, and was televised in the United States on the CBS television network. Tim Tam, who was jockeyed by Ismael Valenzuela, won the race by one and one half lengths over runner-up Lincoln Road. Approximate post time was 5:50 p.m. Eastern Time. The race was run on a fast track in a final time of 1:571/5  The Maryland Jockey Club reported total attendance of 36,912, this is recorded as second highest on the list of American thoroughbred racing top attended events for North America in 1958.

Payout 

The 83rd Preakness Stakes Payout Schedule

The full chart 

 Winning Breeder: Calumet Farm; (KY)
 Winning Time: 1:57 2/5
 Track Condition: Fast
 Total Attendance: 36,912

References

External links 
 

1958
1958 in horse racing
1958 in American sports
1958 in sports in Maryland
Horse races in Maryland